Tumaini University Makumira (TUMA) is a private university located in the town of Makumira, Poli ward, Meru District of   Arusha Region in north Tanzania. Its 2017 ranking at the Webometrics Ranking of World Universities for Tanzania is position 21.

Constituent colleges
The university has the following 5 constituent colleges and training centre:
 Kilimanjaro Christian Medical University College(KCMUCo)
 Tumaini University Dar es Salaam College (TUDARCo)
 Stephano Moshi Memorial University College (SMMUCo)
 Josiah Kibira University College (JoKUCo) was launched January 2013
 TUMA-Mbeya Centre

See also
:Category:Tumaini University Makumira alumni

References

External links
 

Private universities in Tanzania
Universities in Arusha
Educational institutions established in 1997
1997 establishments in Tanzania